Emanuela Pacotto (June 7, 1965) is an Italian actress and voice actress from Milan who has dubbed over a number of notable roles in anime.

Filmography

Television animation
Atomic Betty (Betty Barrett/Atomic Betty (Tajja Isen)) (2nd voice)
Alvin and the Chipmunks (Alvin Seville (Ross Bagdasarian Jr.))
The World of David the Gnome (Anna)
Cubix (Abby (Choi Duk-hee))
Dragon Ball (Bulma (Hiromi Tsuru))
Dragon Tales (Emmy (Andrea Libman))
Fox's Peter Pan & the Pirates (Michael Darling (Whit Hertford))
VeggieTales (Madame Blueberry)
Rolie Polie Olie (Aunt Polie-Anna (Tedde Moore))
Dr. Slump (Akane Kimidori (Kazuko Sugiyama, Hiroko Konishi))
Kodomo no Omocha (Mami Suzuki (Azusa Nakao))
Magical DoReMi (Onpu Segawa (Rumi Shishido))
Mermaid Melody Pichi Pichi Pitch (Rina Tōin (Mayumi Asano))
Mew Mew Power (Corina Bucksworth)
My Little Pony: Friendship Is Magic (Twilight Sparkle)
Trulli Tales (Miss Frisella)
Naruto (Sakura Haruno (Chie Nakamura))
One Piece (Nami (Akemi Okamura))
Pokémon (Jessie of Team Rocket (Megumi Hayashibara))
Revolutionary Girl Utena (Utena Tenjō (Tomoko Kawakami))
Sonic the Hedgehog (Young Sally Acorn)
Yu-Gi-Oh! 5D's (Misty Tredwell)
Drawn Together (Princess Clara) (Tara Strong)
Slayers (Lina Inverse)
Bleach (Orihime Inoue)

Theatrical animation
Ah! My Goddess: The Movie (Megumi Morisato (Yuriko Fuchisaki))
Code Geass: Akito the Exiled (Leila Malkal (Maaya Sakamoto))
One Piece Movies (Nami (Akemi Okamura))
Pokémon: The First Movie (Jessie of Team Rocket (Megumi Hayashibara))
Pokémon: The Movie 2000 (Jessie of Team Rocket (Megumi Hayashibara))
Pokémon 3: The Movie (Jessie of Team Rocket (Megumi Hayashibara))
Pokémon 4Ever (Jessie of Team Rocket (Megumi Hayashibara))
Pokémon Heroes (Jessie of Team Rocket (Megumi Hayashibara))
Pokémon: Lucario and the Mystery of Mew (Jessie of Team Rocket (Megumi Hayashibara))
X (Satsuki Yatoji (Kotono Mitsuishi))

Live action television
Goosebumps (Libby Melissa Bathory) (Attack of the Mutant Parts I & II) (credited as Manuela Pacotto)

Video games
 Resident Evil: Operation Raccoon City (Claire Redfield (Alyson Court)
 Tenchu: Wrath of Heaven (Ayame)
 Elsword.it: Ara Haan
 Baldur's gate 2 Shadows of Amn: Imoen

References

External links
 

1965 births
Italian voice actresses
Living people
Actresses from Milan